Samuel Mancini is an American actor, model and singer-songwriter from Beaver Falls, Pennsylvania. Mancini made his acting debut alongside Olivia Wilde and Diane Keaton in the film Love the Coopers in 2015.

In 2017 Mancini released his debut EP titled ‘’Attention’’.

In 2021 Samuel released his first mixtape, Feed the Fire, which became a Billboard hit in March 2021. It also reached the top-twenty of the iTunes sales chart.

Discography
 Attention – EP (2017)

Mixtapes

Filmography
 Love the Coopers (2015)

References

External links
 Official site

American male singer-songwriters
American singer-songwriters
Living people
21st-century American singers
Place of birth missing (living people)
1994 births
21st-century American male singers